İzbırak is a village in Mardin Province in southeastern Turkey. It is part of the municipality Midyat. It is located in the Midyat District and the historical region of Tur Abdin.

In the village, there are churches of Mor Dimet and Mort Shmuni. There is also the ruins of the church of Mor Gabriel.

The village is populated by Assyrians and by Kurds of the Elîkan tribe had a population of 32 in 2021.

History
Zaz is identified as the settlement of Zazabukha, where the Assyrian king Ashurnasirpal II made camp whilst on campaign against Nairi and received tribute from Khabkhi in 879 BC. Arches on the north side of the church of Mor Dimet suggest pre-Christian buildings originally stood on the site. The church of Mor Dimet was constructed by 932, from which year a funerary inscription survives. A copy of the Syriac diptychs ("Book of Life") written in the village in the early 16th century was found in 1909, but was lost in the Assyrian genocide.

By 1915, Zaz was exclusively inhabited by 2000 Assyrians, with 200 families, all of whom were adherents of the Syriac Orthodox Church. Amidst the Assyrian genocide in the First World War, the village was attacked by Kurds in August 1915, and the villagers took refuge in the church of Mor Dimet and two large houses. After receiving assurances the villagers wouldn't be harmed, 365/366 Assyrians left the buildings, but were taken by the Kurds to a hill named Perbume between Zaz and Heştrek and slaughtered. A survivor of the massacre at Perbume returned to Zaz and warned the villagers, who subsequently held out for a month. Some survivors fled to Ayn Wardo.

An Ottoman official arrived at the village and assured the villagers of their safety, only to separate the young, who were given to Kurds from neighbouring villages, and split the remaining Assyrians in two groups. One group was sent to Kerboran, and the other was sent to Midyat, where they were forced to collect and bury the corpses of Assyrians who had been killed in the streets of those places, as well as pick up animal faeces. Those who did not die of hunger or thirst were killed once the corpses were buried. Some villagers who had survived the genocide were helped to return to Zaz in 1920 by Çelebi, agha (chief) of the Heverkan clan. A portico was added to the church of Mor Dimet in 1924.

In the early 1990s, there were skirmishes between paramilitaries, the Turkish military, and Kurdistan Workers' Party (PKK) militants near the village as part of the Kurdish–Turkish conflict. Paramilitaries and their relatives extorted 20 million Turkish lira from the villagers on 18 February 1992 on threat of killing the mukhtar Gevriye Akyol (village headman). The Assyrian villagers were forced to flee to Midyat in April 1993 upon receiving death threats from paramilitaries, and they remained there in the hope the situation would improve, but again received death threats on returning to Zaz in the summer. The four Kurdish families were allowed to remain, whereas the Assyrians emigrated to Europe, particularly Germany and Sweden.

The church of Mor Dimet was restored in the late 1990s by Assyrians in the diaspora, and a monk and nun took up residence in the church in 2001. It was reported that Kurds from neighbouring villages had seized the Assyrians' houses and land, damaged the church by pouring sewage into it, and verbally and physically abused the monk and nun.

Notable people
Masʿūd II of Ṭur ʿAbdin (1431-1512), Syriac Orthodox Patriarch of Tur Abdin
Hatune Doğan, Nun of the Syriac Orthodox Church

References

Bibliography

Villages in Midyat District
Assyrian communities in Turkey
Tur Abdin
Places of the Assyrian genocide
Populated places in ancient Upper Mesopotamia
Kurdish settlements in Mardin Province